M'lang, officially the Municipality of M'lang (Hiligaynon: Banwa sang M'lang; Maguindanaon: Inged nu Melang, Jawi: ايڠايد نو ملڠ), is a 1st class municipality in the province of Cotabato, Philippines. According to the 2020 census, it has a population of 98,195 people.

Etymology
The name M'lang was derived from a Maguindanaon word Tamlang/Tamelang which means "bamboo".

History
In 1930s, migrants mostly from the islands of Panay and Negros in Western Visayas and some parts of Luzon settled in M'lang. Jacinto Paclibar, who was in search for more fertile lands and vast settlement was the first Christian who settled in M'lang. In the Second World War, he was appointed Chairman of the Civil Emergency Administration under the 118th Infantry Regiment of Wendell Fertig's 10th Military Division, assuming his position in M'lang. After the war ended, he was appointed as Deputy Governor of the undivided Cotabato until 1949. He had in mind a government assisted subdivision project so that landless settlers may have their share to utilize fertile lands for farming and settlement.

M'lang became a regular municipality on August 3, 1951, by virtue of Executive Order No. 462 of the President of the Philippines by the then President Elpidio Quirino, with territories taken from the adjacent towns of Kidapawan (its mother municipality) and Buluan (now part of Maguindanao).

Geography

Barangays
M'lang is politically subdivided into 37 Barangays.

Climate

Demographics

Transportation
The Central Mindanao Airport, in Barangay Tawan-tawan, is intended to serve as the primary air transport hub for agricultural produce of Cotabato and those coming from central Mindanao. It has a 1.2 kilometer runway with a capability for commercial flights, but there are no scheduled flights. Central Mindanao project is designed to provide capacity of 3.5 million passengers p/a.

Notable personalities
 Emmanuel Piñol – Chairman of Mindanao Development Authority, 2019-2021; Secretary of Agriculture, 2016-2019; Governor of Cotabato, 1998-2007

Education

Notre Dame of M'lang
Bialong Elementary School
Mlang Pilot Elementary School
Mlang National High School
Southern Baptist College
Mariano Untal Memorial High School (Bagontapay National High School)
Bagontapay Central Elementary School
Buayan Elementary School
New Barbaza Elementary School
Magallon Elementary School
Lepaga Elementary School
Lika National High School
La Fortuna Elementary School
Dugong Elementary School
Sangat Elementary School
Dalipe Elementary School
New Rizal National High School
Nueva Vida National High School
Katipunan Elementary High School
Katipunan National High School
Don Tomas Buenaflor Elementary School

References

External links
[ Philippine Standard Geographic Code]
M'lang Profile at the DTI Cities and Municipalities Competitive Index
Official Website of the Municipality of M'lang
Kidapawan of the past
WINNERS: M’lang, Cotabato Local Elections 2016 Results

Central Mindanao Airport New Airport Profile | CAPA

Municipalities of Cotabato
Establishments by Philippine executive order